Princess Victoria or Viktoria may refer to:

Royalty

European royalty 
 Duchess Maria Anna Victoria of Bavaria (1660-1690), later Dauphine Victoire of France as the wife of Louis, Grand Dauphin
 Infanta Mariana Victoria of Spain (1718-1781), Queen of Portugal as the wife of Joseph I
 Princess Victoire of France (1733–1799), daughter of Louis XV of France
 Victoria Hedwig Karoline von Anhalt-Bernburg-Schaumburg-Hoym, daughter of Charles Louis, Prince of Anhalt-Bernburg-Schaumburg-Hoym and Marquise de Favras by marriage; often styled as Princess despite being of morganatic birth
 Infanta Mariana Victoria of Portugal (1768–1788), daughter of Maria I and Peter III of Portugal
 Princess Victoria of Saxe-Coburg-Saalfeld, (1786–1861), mother of Queen Victoria
 Queen Victoria (1819–1901), princess until 1837
 Princess Victoria of Saxe-Coburg and Gotha (1822–1857), wife of Prince Louis of Orleans, Duke of Nemours (1814-1896)
 Victoria, Princess Royal (1840–1901), eldest daughter of Queen Victoria and Empress of Germany and Queen of Prussia as the wife of Frederick III
 Princess Augusta Victoria of Schleswig-Holstein (1858-1921), Empress of Germany and Queen of Prussia as the wife of Wilhelm II
 Princess Karoline Mathilde of Schleswig-Holstein-Sonderburg-Augustenburg (1860-1932) (Victoria Frederica Augusta Mary Caroline Matilda), Duchess of Schleswig-Holstein as the wife of Friedrich Ferdinand
 Princess Charlotte of Prussia (1860–1919) (Victoria Elizabeth Augusta Charlotte), eldest daughter of Victoria, Princess Royal and Frederick III of Germany; Duchess of Saxe-Meiningen as the wife of Bernhard III
 Princess Victoria of Baden (1862–1930), queen consort of Gustav V of Sweden
 Princess Victoria of Hesse and by Rhine (1863–1950), wife of Prince Louis of Battenberg; later Victoria Mountbatten, Marchioness of Milford Haven
 Princess Viktoria of Prussia (1866–1929), second daughter of Victoria, Princess Royal and Frederick III of Germany
 Mary of Teck (1867-1953) (Victoria Mary Augusta Louise Olga Pauline Claudine Agnes), wife of George V of the United Kingdom
 Princess Victoria of the United Kingdom (1868–1935), daughter of Edward VII of the United Kingdom
 Princess Helena Victoria of Schleswig-Holstein (1870–1948) (Victoria Louise Sophia Augusta Amelia Helena)
 Princess Victoria Melita of Saxe-Coburg and Gotha (1876–1936), daughter of Alfred, Duke of Saxe-Coburg and Gotha; later Grand Duchess Victoria Feodorovna of Russia
 Princess Margaret of Connaught (1882–1920) (Margaret Victoria Charlotte Augusta Norah), first wife of King Gustaf VI Adolf
 Princess Alice of Battenberg (1885–1969) (Victoria Alice Elizabeth Julia Marie), daughter of Victoria of Hesse and mother of Prince Philip, Duke of Edinburgh
 Princess Victoria Adelaide of Schleswig-Holstein (1885-1970), daughter of Karoline Mathilde of Schleswig Holstein and Frederick Ferdinand, Duke of Schleswig-Holstein and Duchess of Saxe-Coburg and Gotha as the wife of Charles Edward
 Princess Patricia of Connaught (1886–1974) (Victoria Patricia Helena Elizabeth), daughter of Prince Arthur, Duke of Connaught and Strathearn; later Lady Patricia Ramsay
 Princess Alexandra Victoria of Schleswig-Holstein-Sonderburg-Glücksburg (1887–1957), daughter of Karoline Mathilde of Schleswig-Holstein and Frederick Ferdinand, Duke of Schleswig–Holstein
 Princess Karoline Mathilde of Schleswig-Holstein-Sonderburg-Glücksburg (1894-1972) (Victoria-Irene Adelaide Augusta Alberta Feodora Caroline Matilda), daughter of Karoline Mathilde of Schleswig-Holstein and Frederick Ferdinand, Duke of Schleswig–Holstein
 Princess Victoria Eugenie of Battenberg (1887–1969), Queen of Spain as the wife of Alfonso XIII
 Princess Victoria Margaret of Prussia (1890–1923), daughter of Prince Frederick Leopold of Prussia
 Princess Victoria Louise of Prussia (1892–1980),  daughter of Augusta Victoria of Schleswig-Holstein and Wilhelm II of Germany; married Ernst August, Duke of Brunswick and head of the House of Hanover
 Princess Victoria of Leiningen (1895-1973), daughter of Emich, 5th Prince of Leiningen and wife of Count Maximilian of Solms-Rödelheim and Assenheim
 Mary, Princess Royal and Countess of Harewood (1897–1965) (Victoria Alexandra Alice Mary), daughter of King George V
 Princess Victoria Cäcilie of Hesse-Philippsthal-Barchfeld (1914–1998), daughter of Chlodwig, Landgrave of Hesse-Philippsthal-Barchfeld
 Princess Ingrid of Sweden (1910-2000), wife of King Frederick IX of Denmark
 Princess Victoria Marina of Prussia (1917–1981), daughter of Prince Adalbert of Prussia (1884–1948)
 Princess Victoria Marina of Prussia (born 1952), daughter of Prince Frederick of Prussia (1911–1966)
 Victoria, Crown Princess of Sweden (born 1977)
 Princess Victoria Luise of Prussia (born 1982), daughter of Prince Friedrich Wilhelm of Prussia (born 1939) and wife of Ferdinand, Hereditary Prince of Leiningen (born 1982)
 Princess Viktória de Bourbon de Parme (born 1982), wife of Prince Jaime de Bourbon de Parme
 Princess Victoria Romanovna (born 1982), wife of Grand Duke George Mikhailovich of Russia
 Princess Victoria of Hohenzollern (born 2004), daughter of Prince Ferdinand of Hohenzollern (born 1960)

Hawaiian royalty 
 Princess Victoria Kamamalu Kaahumanu IV of the Hawaiian Islands (1838–1866), heiress apparent during the reign of Kamehameha V
 Princess Victoria Kaiulani of the Hawaiian Islands (1875–1899), heiress apparent during Queen Liliuokalani's reign

Other

 Princess Victoria (wrestler) (Vickie Otis), retired wrestler
 Princess Victoria "Tori" of Meribella (Victoria Bethany Evangeline Renee), character from 2012 film Barbie: The Princess & the Popstar
 Archduchess Victoria of Hulstria, Queen of Aloria, character from the online game Particracy
 Princess Victoria of Alteon ("Robina the Hood"), character from the online game AdventureQuest Worlds
 Princess Victoria (public house), a pub in Shepherd's Bush, London, England
 MV Princess Victoria (1939), a ship which was launched in 1939 commissioned as HMS Princess Victoria and sunk in 1940 
 MV Princess Victoria (1946), a ferry which was launched in 1947 and sank in 1953

See also
 Victoria (name)